Lee Ji-hye (born January 11, 1980) is a South Korean singer and actress. She was a member of the pop group Sharp. The group released six albums before their breakup in 2002, attributed to the feud between Lee and fellow female member Seo Ji-young. As a solo artist, she has released several singles. She was a cast member of the variety show Infinite Girls Season 2.

Personal life 
She has been married to Moon Jae-wan since September 18, 2017. She and her husband run a YouTube channel called "Attention Seeking Unnie You Don't Hate".They welcomed their first child, a daughter in 2017. Their second child, a daughter was born on December 24, 2021.

In September 2022, she will donate 50 million won to the Rom Khiao Children Foundation, together with her husband.

Discography

Studio albums

Singles

Filmography

Television show

Web shows

References

External links 
 

1980 births
K-pop singers
Living people
South Korean women pop singers
South Korean television actresses
South Korean female idols
South Korean film actresses
South Korean lyricists
South Korean television presenters
South Korean women television presenters
South Korean broadcasters
Dong-ah Institute of Media and Arts alumni
21st-century South Korean singers
South Korean radio presenters
South Korean women radio presenters
Actresses from Seoul
Singers from Seoul
21st-century South Korean women singers